Giovanni Fazio is an American physicist at Center for Astrophysics  Harvard & Smithsonian. He is an astrophysicist who has initiated and participated in multiple observation programs.

Career
In 1962 he joined the Smithsonian Astrophysical Observatory and the Harvard College Observatory. There he started a program in gamma-ray astronomy using balloon-borne and ground-based detectors, and the construction of the 10-meter optical reflector at the F. L. Whipple Observatory, Arizona, for the search of ultra-high-energy cosmic gamma-rays.

In 1984 Fazio was selected as Principal Investigator for the Infrared Array Camera (IRAC) experiment on the Spitzer Space Telescope (NASA). The telescope was launched in August 2003, and has since produced multiple discoveries and images of the infrared universe.

Fazio is the editor-in-chief of Journal of Astronomical Instrumentation. He is also the main editor of The Encyclopedia of Cosmology.

Awards
In recognition of his scientific contribution, Fazio has received many international awards. He was awarded the 2015 Henry Norris Russell Lectureship for "his pioneering work on gamma-ray and infrared instrumentation, which has advanced our understanding in many areas of astronomy, ranging from near-Earth objects to high-redshift galaxies."

In 2019, Fazio received the SPIE George W. Goddard Award in Space and Airborne Optics "in recognition of exceptional achievements in the area of infrared instruments spanning 40 years including the Infrared Array Camera (IRAC) aboard the Spitzer Space Telescope, which has made extraordinary discoveries from measuring the mass of the most distant galaxy (GN-z11) to finding and characterizing seven Earth-sized planets in the TRAPPIST-1 system."

He was elected a Legacy Fellow of the American Astronomical Society in 2020.

References

Year of birth missing (living people)
Place of birth missing (living people)
Living people
American astrophysicists
St. Mary's University, Texas alumni
Harvard–Smithsonian Center for Astrophysics people
MIT Department of Physics alumni
Spitzer Space Telescope
Academic journal editors
Fellows of the American Astronomical Society